Nicholas Joseph Tremark (October 15, 1912 in Yonkers, New York – September 7, 2000 in Tomball, Texas) was a Major League Baseball outfielder  for the Brooklyn Dodgers. He played from 1934 to 1936. He attended Manhattan College. Prior to his Major League debut, Tremark starred as an outfielder for the 1932 Paterson (NJ) Pros in historic Hinchliffe Stadium's first season. In the first baseball game at Hinchliffe Stadium (July 24, 1932, House of David @ Paterson Pros), Tremark was the first batter to represent a Paterson home team in the stadium's storied history. He was the Pros lead off hitter and started in center field.

External links

1912 births
2000 deaths
Major League Baseball outfielders
Brooklyn Dodgers players
Baseball players from New York (state)
Manhattan Jaspers baseball players
Buffalo Bisons (minor league) players
Reading Brooks players
Sportspeople from Harris County, Texas
Allentown Brooks players
Louisville Colonels (minor league) players
Hartford Laurels players
Little Rock Travelers players
Wilkes-Barre Barons (baseball) players
People from Tomball, Texas